Nagyová is a Czech-  and Slovak-language feminine surname derived from the Hungarian surname Nagy according to the rules of Czech name and Slovak name formation, literally meaning "of Nagy". 

Notable people with this surname include:

Jana Nagyová (born 1959), Slovak actress
Jana Nagyová, former name of Jana Nečasová, former Czech politician and high civil servant 
Henrieta Nagyová, Slovak professional tennis player
Marika Nagyová, former skating partner of Karel Fajfr, German figure skating coach  and a former pair skater for Czechoslovakia

Czech-language surnames
Slovak-language surnames
Surnames of Hungarian origin